"I Loves You, Porgy" is a duet from the 1935 opera Porgy and Bess with music by George Gershwin and lyrics by Ira Gershwin. It was performed in the opera's premiere in 1935 and on Broadway the same year by Anne Brown and Todd Duncan. They recorded the song on volume 2 of the album Selections from George Gershwin's Folk Opera Porgy and Bess in 1942. The duet occurs in act 2, scene 3, Catfish Row, where Porgy promises Bess that he will protect her. Bess has a lover, Crown, who is abusive and continually seduces her.

The song was popularised by Nina Simone's adaptation from her first album, Little Girl Blue.

Analysis

Lyrics

In the lyrics Bess is asking Porgy to stop her from going with Crown, her abusive lover. During the early stages of the opera, Bess' opening stanza was cut out. The re-addition of this stanza into the opera proved crucial in demonstrating Bess' feelings towards Porgy and Crown, as well as showing the extent of Bess's self-understanding. In contrast to the fatal tragedy of Bizet's Carmen and Berg's Marie, Gershwin's Bess is a psychological tragedy. Musicologist Lawrence Starr writes, "she possesses profound self-understanding, and understanding of others, and yet cannot use this knowledge to really help herself do anything more than survive (which of course is already more than Carmen or Marie)."

After the folk-opera's premiere, Duke Ellington said "The times are here to debunk Gershwin's lampblack Negroisms", which was seconded by Ralph Matthews: "The singing, even down to the choral and ensemble numbers, has a conservatory twang."

The representation of the characters' speech in Porgy and Bess is contentious. The folk-opera has been accused of linguistic subordination, where differences of language commonly associated with socio-economically oppressed groups are viewed as linguistic deficits. Naomi André writes: "Coming out of a time when minstrelsy, radio shows such as Amos 'n' Andy, and other media where white actors, singers, and novelists relied on negative stereotypes of black people, Porgy and Bess sounds awkward and dated, at best, to many people today."

Music

Edward D. Latham contends that Gershwin's experimental use of simple rondo form with the main theme as the refrain echoes the tension between Porgy and Bess in the duet, "It is as if Bess is clinging to the refrain for dear life, afraid that if she wanders too far from it, she will lose Porgy's love for good. Once again, it is Porgy who guides Bess back to the home key, re-establishing F major with a half cadence at the end of the B and C sections." Gershwin thereby subverts the rondo forms as a guaranteed sign of confidence and stability into an indication of the situation's volatility. Gershwin had originally changed the title from Porgy to Porgy and Bess to emphasise the romance between the two title characters and accommodate operatic conventions.

On the technicality of Bess's role in the duet, Helen M. Greenwald, chair of the department of music history at New England Conservatory and editor of the Oxford Handbook of Opera, wrote that Bess's solo "requires the legato power of a Puccini heroine".

Porgy and Bess, however, has faced critiscm from musicological circles who do not see Gershwin's arrangements worthy of the technical description 'opera'. His concert works have largely been neglected by music scholars due to his stylistic ambiguity. David Horn, founding editor of the journal Popular Music and director of the Institute of Popular Music at the University of Liverpool, claims, "Behind this esoteric front, the basic question is Porgy and Besss stature as a 'work of art', capable (or not) of shedding illumination on fundamental human issues".

Cultural significance 

Due to the celebrity status of the Gershwins at the time of the opera's premier in New York, 1935, responses to the description of Porgy and Bess as a 'folk play' or 'folk opera' opened discussion surrounding folk culture and in particular, southern black folk culture, into the public forum.

Nina Simone's release of "I Loves You, Porgy" and conversations surrounding black representation were contemporaneous. Sarah Tomlinson claimed "while 'I Loves You, Porgy' was one of eleven tracks on her album, it was the only song that had previously been popularised by black women musicians. The song that launched Simone into the public eye was one that fit audience expectations of black women musicianship."

After Gershwin's death in 1937, Porgy and Bess was revived in New York in 1942, a production which toured as well. The popular hits from the opera ("I Loves You, Porgy", "Summertime") maintained circulation on the radio. Leading orchestras in America had "all-Gershwin" programs. Nina Simone's recording of the song (from her first album, Little Girl Blue, 1958) went to number eighteen on the Billboard Hot 100 and number two on the R&B charts. Christina Aguilera performed the song at the Grammy Nomination Concert in December 2008. The folk opera Porgy and Bess returned to the Metropolitan Opera for the first time in nearly 30 years for their 2019–20 season.

Criticism

Whilst the folk opera has received criticism that Gershwin biographer Rodney Greenberg describes as a questioning of whether the characters are "the same old black stereotypes with their naive superstitions, their whoring and their gambling?", Bess' character in the opera and her lines in the duet have been praised for adding complexity to her character's psyche.

Hall Johnson, who was outspoken on his disagreement with the opera's recitatives, found Bess' duet to be "such vibrant beauty, so replete with the tragedy of the minor spirituals, that most of what follows is made to sound a little more false by reason of the absolute rightness of this episode".

Maya Angelou, who danced in Porgy and Bess premiere at Milan's La Scala opera house, writes how she connected with the story, also finding the duet's narrative to be compelling: "Who could deny this story? How many Black men had been crippled by American oppression and had lost the women they loved and who loved them, because they hadn't the strength to fight? How often had the women submitted to loveless arrangements for the sake of bare survival?"

References 

Sources

External links
"I Loves You, Porgy", details, text; opera-arias.com
, Audra McDonald, Norm Lewis

1935 songs
Songs from Porgy and Bess
Songs with lyrics by Ira Gershwin
Male–female vocal duets
1930s jazz standards